The 2008–09 Eredivisie season was the 48th season of the Eredivisie in basketball, the highest professional basketball league in the Netherlands. MyGuide Amsterdam won their 7th national title on 31 May 2009, after defeating EiffelTowers Den Bosch in Game 7 of the finals.

Regular season

Playoffs

References

Dutch Basketball League seasons
1
Netherlands